McKane is a surname. Notable people with the surname include:

Alice Woodby McKane (1865–1948), American physician
Charlotte McKane (born 1995)
John McKane, British politician
Kathleen McKane Godfree, English badminton and tennis player

See also
McKane v. Durston, a United States Supreme Court case